The 2018–19 Cal State Northridge Matadors men's basketball team represented California State University, Northridge in the 2018–19 NCAA Division I men's basketball season. The Matadors,  led by first-year head coach Mark Gottfried, competed at the Matadome. CSU Northridge was a member of the Big West Conference, and participated in their 18th consecutive season in that league. They finished the season 13–21, 7–9 in Big West play to finish in a tie for sixth place. They lost in the quarterfinals of the Big West tournament to UC Santa Barbara. They were invited to the College Basketball Invitational where they lost in the first round to Utah Valley.

Previous season

The Matadors finished 6–24 overall, and 3–13 in the conference. During the season, the Matadors participated in the Cancún Challenge under the Mayan division, which was held in Fresno, California, Fairfax, Virginia, and Cancún, Mexico. The Matadors finished in 4th place from losing to Southeast Missouri State and Binghamton. Prior to the tournament, CSU Northridge lost at Fresno State and at George Mason as friendly matches.

Offseason

Departures

Roster

Schedule

|-
!colspan=12 style=""| Exhibition

|-
!colspan=12 style=""| Non–conference regular season

|-
!colspan=12 style=""| Big West regular season

|-
!colspan=12 style=""| Big West tournament

|-
!colspan=12 style=""| College Basketball Invitational

References

Cal State Northridge
Cal State Northridge Matadors men's basketball seasons
Cal State Northridge
Cal State Northridge
Cal State Northridge